Marcos José Franklin Macena de Melo, known as Marquinhos Caruaru (born 4 November 1977 in Caruaru), is a Brazilian football player.

Football career
In August 2007, Marquinhos moved to C.D. Santa Clara, but in January 2007, he moved back to Brazil for Santa Cruz (Série B), signed a one-year deal.

in December 2008, he signed a 1-year deal for Central.  In June 2009 he left for CRAC but released in July.

External links

 Brazilian FA Database

1977 births
Living people
Brazilian footballers
Association football fullbacks
Sportspeople from Pernambuco
Clube Atlético Mineiro players
Club Athletico Paranaense players
Fortaleza Esporte Clube players
Goiás Esporte Clube players
Sociedade Esportiva Palmeiras players
Santa Cruz Futebol Clube players
Central Sport Club players
C.D. Santa Clara players